This is a List of countries by copper smelter production for 2015, figures are for either primary or undifferentiated  copper production.

See also 
 List of countries by copper production

References 
* Source indexmundi 

Copper
Smelter production